Viamonte may refer to:

 Juan José Viamonte, 19th century Argentine general.
 General Viamonte Partido, a political division in Buenos Aires Province, Argentina.
 Avelino Viamonte, 1908 Argentine film.
 Juan Bitrián de Viamonte y Navarra, colonial governor of Cuba.
 Town in Unión Department, Córdoba Province, Argentina.
 Carlos Sánchez Viamonte, member of the Argentine University Federation.
 Barão de Viamonte da Boa Vista, Portuguese baron.
 Modesto Sánchez Viamonte, member of the Civic Youth Union of Argentina.
 Viamonte FC, an Association Football club in Argentina.
 6th "General Viamonte" Mechanized Infantry Regiment in Argentina.
 Florinda Viamontes, javelin throw competitor at the 1938 Central American and Caribbean Games.